Ozren Bonačić (born 5 January 1942) is a former Croatian water polo player and Olympic medalist with the Yugoslavia men's national water polo team.

During his club career he played for HAVK Mladost, with which he won four European championship titles. Since 1978 he has been a water polo coach, and he also coached Mladost for many seasons, winning the European championship in 1996. He was most recently the coach of Mladost in the 2008/09 season.

See also
 Yugoslavia men's Olympic water polo team records and statistics
 List of Olympic champions in men's water polo
 List of Olympic medalists in water polo (men)
 List of players who have appeared in multiple men's Olympic water polo tournaments

References

External links
 

1942 births
Living people
Sportspeople from Zagreb
Croatian male water polo players
Croatian water polo coaches
Yugoslav male water polo players
Water polo players at the 1964 Summer Olympics
Water polo players at the 1968 Summer Olympics
Water polo players at the 1972 Summer Olympics
Water polo players at the 1976 Summer Olympics
Olympic water polo players of Yugoslavia
Olympic gold medalists for Yugoslavia
Olympic silver medalists for Yugoslavia
Olympic medalists in water polo
Medalists at the 1968 Summer Olympics
Medalists at the 1964 Summer Olympics